The Canberra Gunners are an Australian basketball team based in Canberra. The Gunners compete in the Men's NBL1 East and play their home games at Belconnen Stadium. The team is affiliated with Basketball ACT, the governing body for basketball in the Australian Capital Territory. Their sister team, the Canberra Nationals, play in the Women's NBL1 East.

In 1988, the Gunners made their debut in the SEABL. Former player Brad Barnes coached the Gunners to the SEABL East Conference title in 2003. Canberra's NBL side, the Cannons, coincidentally folded in 2003, leaving the Gunners as the city's only elite male basketball team.

In November 2018, following the demise of the SEABL, the Gunners joined the Waratah League. The Waratah League was rebranded as NBL1 East for the 2022 season. The Gunners subsequently won the 2022 NBL1 East championship.

References

External links
Basketball ACT's official website

South East Australian Basketball League teams
Basketball teams established in 1988
Basketball teams in the Australian Capital Territory
Gunners
1988 establishments in Australia